The Adventures of Hyperman is an American animated series that aired from November 4, 1995 to August 10, 1996 on CBS. The show features an intergalactic sheriff fighting the evil monster Entrobe and his sidekick Kidd Chaos. Hyperman is joined by his own sidekicks, Studd Puppy and 13-year-old science genius Emma C. Squared. The only voice actor to appear in both the game and the cartoon is Frank Welker.

Background
The program is based on an interactive computer game of the same name. The property was created by Kevin O'Donnell, Ken Corr and Crag Southard. It was released as a CD-ROM by IBM prior to running as an animated series.

Voice cast
 Steve Mackall as Hyperman 
 Max Casella as Studd Puppy 
 Maurice LaMarche as Kidd Chaos/Comptroller 
 Frank Welker as Entrobe 
 Mayim Bialik as Brittany Bright
 Tamera Mowry as Emma C. Squared 
 Neil Ross as the Narrator

Episodes

References

External links

 

1995 American television series debuts
1996 American television series endings
1990s American animated television series
1990s American superhero comedy television series
American children's animated comedy television series
American children's animated superhero television series
CBS original programming
English-language television shows
Television series by Sony Pictures Television
Television series by Hyperion Pictures